The women's 1,500 metres at the 2013 IPC Athletics World Championships was held at the Stade du Rhône from 20–29 July.

Medalists

See also
List of IPC world records in athletics

References

1,500 metres
2013 in women's athletics
1500 metres at the World Para Athletics Championships